This is a list of orders, decorations and medals of the Republic of China, usually known as Taiwan after 1949. This list is sorted in order of precedence of the highest grade of each award on a full military dress. The Honour Sabre is a special case and is listed separately under Military orders, as per its official classification by the Ministry of National Defense.

Military orders

Military medals

General Armed Forces medals

Army medals

Navy medals

Air Force medals

Victory medals

Commemorative and Service awards

Civilian orders

Defunct orders
Prior to the modern system, the Republican government established numerous orders that are now defunct.

Nanjing Era
After the founding of the Republic, the Provisional Government of the Republic of China (1912) in Nanjing established the following orders in 1912:
 Order of the Nine Tripods (九鼎勳章): 9 grades, a military decoration.
 Order of Tiger and Bear (虎羆勳章): 9 grades, a military decoration.
 Order of the Waking Lion (醒獅勳章): 9 grades, mixed military and civilian decoration.

Beiyang Era
The Beiyang government re-established the honour system with the following orders:
 Grand Merit Order (大勳章): for ceremonial use by the Head of State.
 Badge of Mongolian, Hui and Tibetan Nobility (蒙回藏爵章): 5 grades, awarded to lords of Mongolia, Xinjiang and Tibet who bore Qing dynasty princely and ducal titles. The grades of this order correspond to Qing's princely ranks.
 Order of Rank and Merit (勳位章): 5 grades, highest general decoration.
 Order of Precious Brilliant Golden Grain (寶光嘉禾勳章): 5 grades and 6 classes, awarded only to high-level officials.
 Order of the Golden Grain (嘉禾勳章): 9 grades, civilian decoration.
 Order of the White Eagle (白鷹勳章): 9 grades.
 Order of the Striped Tiger (文虎勳章): 9 grades, military decoration.
 Order of Cloud and Crane (雲鶴勳章)
 Order of the Golden Lion (金獅勳章)
 Order of the Nebula (星雲勳章)
 Order of the Begonia (棠勳章)
 Medal of Compassion (慈惠章): awarded to women in charitable works.

Various warlords also issued their own orders and commemorative medals.

See also 
Imperial yellow jacket
Mandarin square
Nine bestowments
Order of the Double Dragon

Notes

References

Explanation of Decorations. Department of Public Service, Ministry of National Defense, ROC.
Orders, Decorations and Medals of Taiwan (Republic of China). Medals of the World.
National Seal and Orders. Office of the President, Republic of China (Taiwan).

 
Republic of China-related lists
Republic of China